Jocasta or Iocaste is a character in Greek mythology.

It may also refer to:
 Iocaste (moon), a moon of Jupiter
 Jocasta (band), a 1990s Britpop band
 Jocasta (Rome character), a minor character in the TV series Rome
 Jocasta (comics), a Marvel Comics character
 Jocaste (crustacean), a shrimp genus
 Jocasta Nu, a minor Star Wars character
 899 Jokaste, a minor planet orbiting the Sun
 Jocasta Ayrs, a character from the novel Cloud Atlas
 Jocasta Cameron, a character from the novel series Outlander